The UK Albums Chart is one of many music charts compiled by the Official Charts Company that calculates the best-selling albums of the week in the United Kingdom. Since 2004 the chart has been based on the sales of both physical albums and digital downloads. Since 2015, the album chart has been based on both sales and streaming. This list shows albums that peaked in the top ten of the UK Albums Chart during 2020, as well as albums which peaked in 2019 and 2021 but were in the top 10 in 2020. The entry date is when the album appeared in the top 10 for the first time (week ending, as published by the Official Charts Company, which is six days after the chart is announced).

One-hundred and ninety-eight albums were in the top ten this year. Fine Line by Harry Styles debuted in 2019 and re-entered the top 10 in 2020, but its peak position was not until 2021. Christmas by Michael Bublé was originally released in 2011, launched a new chart run in 2019, reaching a peak on its latest run in 2020 and again in 2021, when it returned to number-one. Heavy is the Head by Stormzy was the only album from 2019 to reach its peak in 2020. Little Mix scored the fastest-selling album of 2020 by a British act with Confetti. Thirteen albums from 2019 remained in the top ten for several weeks at the beginning of the year. Lil Uzi Vert was among the many artists who achieved their first top 10 album in 2020.

The first new number-one album of the year was Heavy Is the Head by Stormzy. Overall, forty-one different albums peaked at number-one so in 2020, with Taylor Swift (2) having the most albums hit that position.

Background

Chart debuts
The following table (collapsed on desktop site) does not include acts who had previously charted as part of a group and secured their first top-ten solo album, or featured appearances on compilations or other artists recordings. 
 

Notes

Louis Tomlinson of the group One Direction reached the top 10 with his debut solo album this year, Walls. This added to his haul of five top 10 albums with One Direction to date, including four which had topped the chart.

Best-selling albums
For the second year in a row, Lewis Capaldi had the best-selling album of the year with Divinely Uninspired to a Hellish Extent. The album has now sold over 900,000 copies in the UK alone and has been certified 3× platinum by the BPI. Fine Line by Harry Styles came in second place. Dua Lipa's Future Nostalgia, When We Fall Asleep Where Do We Go by Billie Eilish and Stormzy's Heavy Is the Head made up the top five. Albums by Pop Smoke, Ed Sheeran, Queen, Elton John and Fleetwood Mac were also in the top ten best-selling albums of the year.

Top-ten albums
Key

Entries by artist

The following table shows artists who have achieved two or more top 10 entries in 2020, including albums that reached their peak in 2019. The figures only include main artists, with featured artists and appearances on compilation albums not counted individually for each artist. The total number of weeks an artist spent in the top ten in 2020 is also shown.

See also
List of UK Albums Chart number ones of the 2020s

References
General

Specific

External links
2020 album chart archive at the Official Charts Company (click on relevant week)

United Kingdom top 10 albums
Top 10 albums
2020